Sunbonnet Sue is a 1945 American comedy musical film directed by Ralph Murphy and starring Gale Storm, Phil Regan and George Cleveland. The film's composer, Edward J. Kay, was nominated for an Academy Award for Best Original Score in 1946.

Cast 
Gale Storm as Sue Casey
Phil Regan as Danny
George Cleveland as Casey, Tavern Owner
Minna Gombell as Mrs. Fitzgerald
Edna Holland Julia (as Edna M. Holland)
Raymond Hatton as Joe Feeney
Charles D. Brown as Father Hurley
Alan Mowbray as Jonathan
Charles Judels as Milano
Gerald Oliver Smith Masters (as Gerald O. Smith)
William E. Green Flaherty (as Billy Green)
Jerry Franks Jr. as Burke
Michael Raffetto Commentator (voice)

See also 
List of American films of 1945

Bibliography 
Albagli, Fernando (1988). Tudo Sobre o Oscar. Rio de Janeiro: EBAL. 
Filho, Rubens Ewald (2003). O Oscar e Eu. São Paulo: Companhia Editora Nacional. 
Maltin, Leonard (2010). Classic Movie Guide second edition. Nova Iorque: Plume.

External links
 
 
 

1945 films
American black-and-white films
American musical comedy films
Monogram Pictures films
Films directed by Ralph Murphy
1945 musical comedy films
1940s English-language films
1940s American films